A Night with Eddie Condon is a 2001  album by clarinetist Kenny Davern originally recorded live in 1971, joined of course by guitarist Eddie Condon. Performing swing and dixieland tunes that night, they are joined by Lou McGarity on trombone, among others.

Track listing 
"At the Jazz Band Ball"
"Rosetta"
"Royal Garden Blues"
"Ain't Misbehavin'"
"Jazz Me Blues"
"Rose of Washington Square"
"Muskrat Ramble"
"I Can't Get Started"
"China Boy"
"Rose Room"
"That's a Plenty"
"St. Louis Blues"

Personnel
Kenny Davern – clarinet, soprano saxophone
Eddie Condon – guitar
Bernie Privin – trumpet
Lou McGarity – trombone
Dill Jones – piano
Cliff Leeman – drums

References

Kenny Davern albums
Dixieland revival albums
Dixieland albums
2001 live albums
Live swing albums
Arbors Records live albums